Mafia comedy films are a subgenre hybrid of comedy films and crime/gangster films.

Criteria
Mafia comedies revolve around organized crime, often specifically the Italian-American Mafia but also other mafias or mafia-like crime groups, and a comedic plot line, usually involving a chase or a complicated situation involving gangsters or organized crime. Much of the humor in such films is based upon the portrayal of gangsters as ordinary people. The perceived view of gangsters is that they are tough, serious, mysterious, and often quite evil characters; so when a film portrays a side of normality to a gangster character, it can have a humorous effect. Crime/gangster films typically involve many comedic moments, especially during witty conversations between gang members.  This can be seen in such films as Goodfellas, Casino, Lock, Stock and Two Smoking Barrels, Pulp Fiction, and Snatch.

Examples of mafia comedy
Some Like It Hot
Mafioso
The Gang That Couldn't Shoot Straight
Prizzi's Honor
Johnny Dangerously
Oscar
The Whole Nine Yards
My Blue Heaven 
Wise Guys
Corky Romano
The Freshman
Harlem Nights
Married to the Mob  
Mickey Blue Eyes 
Jane Austen's Mafia! 
Analyze This
Analyze That
You Kill Me 
The television series Lilyhammer
The Irish crime thriller, In Bruges, which stars Colin Farrell, may also be considered a dark mob comedy.

References

Film genres
Crime films
 
1980s in film
1990s in film
2000s in film